The African Charter on Democracy, Elections and Governance (ADC) is a document adopted by member states of the African Union (AU) on January 30, 2007, in order to promote liberal democracy and human rights in Africa. It is the first binding document adopted by members of the African Union. Among its provisions are several aimed at combating unconstitutional regime changes, including the first legal instrument adopted by the AU acknowledging that constitutional coups are a form of unconstitutional regime change.

Cameroon and Burkina Faso, two semi-authoritarian countries, have ratified the ADC, indicating that adoption of the charter on its own is not enough to prevent authoritarianism in Africa.

Background 
The supranational organization which preceded the AU, the Organization of African Unity, had a similar accord called the Declaration on the Framework for OAU Response to Unconstitutional Changes in Government, or the "Lomé Declaration," for short. Under the Lomé Declaration, the OAU was equipped with an official framework to deal with unconstitutional changes of government in Africa. However, the Declaration was largely ineffective due to a number of reasons, including that the Lomé Declaration was not legally binding, it failed to create a framework for democratizing authoritarian countries, it defined unconstitutional changes narrowly, excluding constitutional coups, and it failed to create sufficient enforcement mechanisms. The ADC would later attempt to address some of these problems by making the charter binding and including constitutional coups in its mandate, for example.

The ADC was also preceded by a number of AU instruments which had similar goals of promoting democracy, protecting human rights, and preventing unconstitutional regime changes. Among these are the Constitutive Act of the AU, the African Charter on Human and Peoples' Rights, the Declaration on the Principles Governing Democratic Elections in Africa, and the AU Convention on Preventing and Combating Corruption.

Adoption by member states 
Adopted in 2007, the charter only came into effect on February 15, 2012. Signature and ratification by member states, however, has been a slow and continual process since the charter's inception. Many of the more authoritarian member states of the African Union were unwilling to ratify the ADC because of its expansive provisions designed to encourage liberal democracy. By 2009, 29 of 55 member states had signed the ADC, and only three had ratified it.

In order for a member state to adopt the charter, the head of state must sign the charter during an AU meeting, at which point it may be ratified. However, the ratification process is often prohibitively complicated, especially in states which lack the political will to adopt the charter in the first place. Ratification typically requires significant input from all key government and non-governmental stakeholders and often involves making preemptive costly adjustments to national institutions to be in accordance with the principles of the charter.

Of the 55 member states that make up the African Union, 46 have signed, 34 have ratified, and 34 have deposited.

See also 
 Inter-American Democratic Charter
 Ushuaia Protocol

References

Submission for Review 

Governance
Democracy
African Union treaties
International relations
International law
African political history